Chersomorpha biocellana is a species of moth of the family Tortricidae first described by Francis Walker in 1863. It is found in Papua New Guinea and on Borneo.

References

Moths described in 1863
Phricanthini